Vizzavona is a village of the commune of Vivario in the Haute-Corse department of France on the island of Corsica at an altitude of 900 meters. The village is dominated by Monte d'Oro (2389m).

Transport 

The town is served by a station on the Corsican Railways.

Tourism 

It marks the halfway point of the GR20 walking route.

Haute-Corse
Villages in Corsica
Haute-Corse communes articles needing translation from French Wikipedia